The 1992–93 Russian Cup was the first ever season of the Russian football knockout tournament since the dissolution of Soviet Union.

First round
2 May 1992.

Second round
15 April 1992.

18 April 1992.

19 April 1992.

23 May 1992.

Third round
1 May 1992.

2 May 1992.

13 June 1992.

Fourth round
Russian Premier League team FC Dynamo-Gazovik Tyumen started at this stage.

13 June 1992.

4 July 1992.

23 July 1992.

Fifth round
Russian Premier League teams FC Kuban Krasnodar, FC Zenit St. Petersburg and FC Krylia Sovetov Samara started at this stage.

23 July 1992.

27 August 1992.

Round of 32

All the other Russian Premier League teams started at this stage.

Round of 16

Quarter-finals

Semi-finals

Final

MATCH RULES
90 minutes.
30 minutes of extra-time if necessary.
Penalty shootout if scores still level.
Seven named substitutes
Maximum of 3 substitutions.

Played in the earlier stages, but were not on the final game squad:

FC Torpedo Moscow: Mikhail Murashov (DF), Aleksey Shchigolev (DF), Gennadi Grishin (MF), Dmitri Kuznetsov (MF), Igor Aslanyan (MF), Sergey Borisov (MF), Aleksandr Sudarikov (MF), Andrei Talalayev (FW), Yuri Tishkov (FW).

PFC CSKA Moscow: Dmitri Kharine (GK), Dmitri Bystrov (DF), Sergei Fokin (DF), Yevgeni Bushmanov (MF), Aleksandr Grishin (MF), Mikhail Kolesnikov (MF), Sergei Krutov (MF), Yuri Bavykin (MF), Aleksei Poddubskiy (MF).

References

Russian Cup seasons
Russian Cup
Cup
Cup